Nurudeen Abdulai (born 24 June 1997) is a Ghanaian professional footballer who plays as a defender for Ghanaian Premier League Aduana Stars. He previously played for Ashanti Gold and Karela United.

Career

Ashanti Gold 
Abdulai played for Obuasi-based club Ashanti Gold before moving to Karela United. He featured in 6 league matches in 2018 Ghanaian Premier League season before the league was abandoned due to the dissolution of the GFA in June 2018, as a result of the Anas Number 12 Expose.

Karela United 
In September 2018, he was signed by Western Region-based club Karela United by then coach Johnson Smith on an initial two-year contract. He became a key member of the club, as he featured in 7 league matches before the league was put on hold and later cancelled due to the COVID-19 pandemic. He featured in 10 league matches in the first round of the 2020–21 Ghana Premier League and helped them to a first round 1st place league position before joining Aduana Stars in March 2021. He played a total of 26 league matches before leaving the club after his contract expired.

Aduana Stars 
In March 2021, when Abdulai's contract with the club expired he left Karela as a free agent after the first round of the season and signed a 2-year deal with Aduana Stars. He was signed to replace the club's defender Farouk Adams who was in custody and standing trial for allegedly killing a Police officer with a car.

References

External links 

 

Living people
1997 births
Association football defenders
Ghanaian footballers
Ashanti Gold SC players
Karela United FC players
Aduana Stars F.C. managers
Ghana Premier League players